Valiollah Fallahi  (1931 – 29 September 1981) was a military officer and prominent figure during the Iran–Iraq War.

Career
Fallahi served as commander ground forces. Until June 1980 he was the deputy commander of joint staff. He was appointed by Abolhassan Bani Sadr as joint chief of staff in June 1980.

Death

On 29 September 1981, he died along with several other top commanders, including General Javad Fakouri (Air Force Commander), General Yousef Kolahdouz (Acting Commander of the Revolutionary Guards), Colonel Sayyid Mousa Namjoo (Defence Minister) and Commander Jahanara in a plane crash that was due to land in Tehran after take off from Ahvaz.

Ayatollah Ruhollah Khomeini made a speech following the incident and made a reference to Mujahedeen Khalq as the perpetrator without clearly condemning the leftist group.

References

1981 deaths
1931 births
Islamic Republic of Iran Army personnel of the Iran–Iraq War
Islamic Republic of Iran Army brigadier generals
Victims of aviation accidents or incidents in Iran
Commanders of Islamic Republic of Iran Army Ground Force
Imperial Iranian Army brigadier generals